Kür Qarabucaq (also, Kyurkarabudzhak, Karabudzhag, Karabudzhakh, and Karabujakh) is a village and municipality in the Neftchala Rayon of Azerbaijan.  It has a population of 1,103.

References 

Populated places in Neftchala District